Muretinci is a settlement on the left bank of the Drava River in the Municipality of Gorišnica in northeastern Slovenia. The area traditionally belonged to the Styria region. It is now included in the Drava Statistical Region.

Muretinci Castle is a Renaissance castle in the settlement. It dates to the mid-17th century. It has four corner towers connected on three sides and an arcaded courtyard.

References

External links
Muretinci on Geopedia

Populated places in the Municipality of Gorišnica